It emerged in late 2014 that Bill Cosby, an American media personality, sexually assaulted dozens of women throughout his career. Cosby made significant contributions to American and African-American culture, and is well known in the United States for his eccentric image, and gained a reputation as "America's Dad" for his portrayal of Cliff Huxtable on The Cosby Show (1984-1992). He received numerous awards and honorary degrees throughout his career, most of which have since been revoked.

Cosby has been accused by approximately 60 women of rape, drug-facilitated sexual assault, sexual battery, child sexual abuse, sexual misconduct and sexual harassment. The earliest incidents allegedly took place in the mid-1960s. Assault allegations against Cosby became more public after a stand-up routine by comedian Hannibal Buress in October 2014, alluding to Cosby's covert sexual misbehavior; thereafter, many additional claims were made. The dates of the alleged incidents have spanned from 1965 to 2008 in ten U.S. states and in one Canadian province. Cosby has maintained his innocence and repeatedly denied the allegations made against him. Amid the allegations, numerous organizations severed ties with Cosby and revoked honors and titles previously awarded to him. Media organizations pulled reruns of The Cosby Show and other television programs featuring Cosby from syndication. Ninety-seven colleges and universities rescinded honorary degrees.

Most of the alleged acts fall outside the statute of limitations for criminal legal proceedings, but criminal charges were filed against Cosby in one case and numerous civil lawsuits were brought against him. As of November 2015, eight related civil suits were active against him. Gloria Allred represented 33 of the alleged victims. In July 2015, some court records were unsealed and released to the public from Andrea Constand's 2005 civil suit against Cosby. The full transcript of his deposition was released to the media by a court reporting service. In his testimony, Cosby admitted to casual sex involving recreational use of the sedative-hypnotic methaqualone (Quaaludes) with a series of young women, and he acknowledged that his dispensing the prescription drug was illegal.

In December 2015, three Class II felony charges of aggravated indecent assault were filed against Cosby in Montgomery County, Pennsylvania, based on allegations by Constand concerning incidents in January 2004. Cosby's first trial in June 2017 ended in a mistrial. Cosby was found guilty of three counts of aggravated indecent assault at retrial on April 26, 2018 and on September 25, 2018, he was sentenced to three to ten years in state prison and fined $25,000 plus the cost of the prosecution, $43,611. Cosby appealed on June 25, 2019 and the verdict was subsequently upheld and granted an appeal by the Pennsylvania Supreme Court. On June 30, 2021, the Pennsylvania Supreme Court found that an agreement with a previous prosecutor, Bruce Castor, prevented Cosby from being charged in the case, and overruled the conviction. The Supreme Court's decision prevents him from being tried on the same charges a third time. The Montgomery County district attorney's office filed a certiorari petition asking the U.S. Supreme Court to hear the case, but on March 7, 2022, the petition was denied, making the decision of the state supreme court final. Cosby’s legal issues continued following his release from prison. In 2014 Judy Huth had filed a civil suit against Cosby in California, alleging that he had sexually assaulted her in 1975, when she was 16 years old. The trial began in 2022, and the jury ruled in Huth’s favour. Cosby was ordered to pay $500,000 in compensatory damages.

Background

1965–1996 allegations

The earliest allegation against Bill Cosby dates back to December 1965: in 2005, Kristina Ruehli came forward as Jane Doe #12 in the Andrea Constand case and alleged that Cosby had drugged and assaulted her at that time in his Beverly Hills home. Further, Ruehli said she had told her boyfriend about the incident, and had told her daughter in the 1980s.

In the early 1980s, Joan Tarshis told freelance reporter John Milward about an alleged sexual assault by Cosby. Milward did not write about the allegations. In 1996, Playboy Playmate Victoria Valentino gave a videotaped interview in which she made sexual assault allegations against Cosby. The interview was conducted for an exposé on the lives of Playboy models, which was never published.

After the allegations resurfaced in 2014, Wendy Williams recalled that during her radio show in 1990, she referred to sexual assault allegations against Cosby that had been published in the National Enquirer tabloid. Williams said Cosby called her boss in the middle of the broadcast demanding that Williams be fired.

Later allegations and investigations (2000–2006)

On February 1, 2000, according to a statement provided by Detective Jose McCallion of the New York County District Attorney's Special Victims Bureau, Lachele Covington, who was 20 years old at the time, filed a criminal complaint against Cosby alleging that on January 28, 2000, at his Manhattan townhouse, he had tried to put her hands down his pants and then exposed himself. Covington also alleged that Cosby grabbed her breasts and tried to put his hands down her pants. Cosby was questioned and insisted "it was not true." The New York City Police Department (NYPD) referred her complaint to the D.A., but they declined to prosecute.

In January 2004, Andrea Constand, a former Temple University employee, accused Cosby of drugging and fondling her; however, in February 2005, Montgomery County, Pennsylvania's District Attorney said there would be no charges due to insufficient credible and admissible evidence. Constand then filed a civil claim in March 2005, with thirteen women as potential witnesses if the case went to court. Cosby settled out of court for an undisclosed amount in November 2006. After learning that charges were not pursued in the Constand case, California lawyer Tamara Lucier Green, the only publicly named woman in the prior case, came forward with allegations in February 2005 that Cosby had drugged and assaulted her in the 1970s. Cosby's lawyer said Cosby did not know her and that the events did not happen.

In a July 2005 Philadelphia Daily News interview, Beth Ferrier, one of the anonymous "Jane Doe" witnesses in the Constand case, alleged that in 1984 Cosby had drugged her coffee and she awoke with her clothes partially removed. In 2005, Shawn Upshaw Brown, a woman with whom Cosby admitted to having an extramarital affair in the 1970s, claimed in the National Enquirer that Cosby drugged and raped her the last time the two were together sexually. Brown is the mother of Autumn Jackson, who claims to be Cosby's illegitimate daughter. Jackson was convicted in 1997 of extortion after she threatened to make the claims public in the Globe tabloid. In 2015, Brown went into more detail with her renewed allegations in an interview.

On June 9, 2006, Philadelphia magazine published an article by Robert Huber which gave graphic detail about Constand's allegations, and the similar stories told by Green and Ferrer about how they stated that they too were drugged and sexually assaulted. With these severe allegations against Cosby, Huber wrote: "His lawyers have gotten it pushed to the back burner, down to a simmer, and maybe it will amount to nothing, yet there is also the possibility that it will bubble up to destroy him." The article was titled Dr. Huxtable & Mr. Hyde, in allusion to both Cosby's character Dr. Cliff Huxtable on The Cosby Show and to a person having two starkly distinct "Jekyll and Hyde" personalities. This article also presented Barbara Bowman, who had come forward after having read about Constand's story, saying she could not sit in silence any longer. Details of Bowman's similar drug and sexual assault allegations were published in the magazine's November 1, 2006 issue. Bowman reported two incidents that happened around early 1986, wherein she was eighteen years old and working as an aspiring model and actress after her agent had introduced her to Cosby and he had become her good friend and mentor, saying that she escaped his attacks, returned home to Denver and Cosby thereafter subverted her career.

Hannibal Buress remarks (October 2014) 

On October 16, 2014, as part of a stand-up comedy routine in Philadelphia, Hannibal Buress addressed Cosby's legacy of "talk[ing] down" to young black men about their mode of dress and lifestyle. Buress criticized the actor's public moralizing by saying, "Yeah, but you raped women, Bill Cosby, so that kind of brings you down a couple notches." The audience appeared to respond to Buress's accusation as an incredulous joke, then he encouraged everyone to search "Bill Cosby rape" on Google when they got home. Buress had been using the same Cosby routine for the previous six months with little response, but word of the October performance spread rapidly after being posted on Philadelphia magazine's website. Media coverage intensified, with numerous publications tackling the question of how Cosby had managed to maintain, as Buress called it in his routine, a "teflon image" despite more than a decade of public sexual abuse accusations.

Shortly afterward, USA Today reported that either Cosby or his representative posted a request for Twitter followers to "Go ahead. Meme me!" The tweet was deleted after a large number of the submitted memes made reference to the accusations against Cosby.

Additional assault allegations
After Buress's remarks came to the attention of journalist Joan Tarshis, in November 2014, model Janice Dickinson, actress Louisa Moritz, actor Lou Ferrigno's wife Carla, Florida nurse Therese Serignese, Playboy Playmates Valentino and Sarita Butterfield, actress Michelle Hurd, and eleven other women also made accusations of alleged assaults by Cosby committed against them between 1965 and 2004. Charlotte Laws wrote a November 2014 article published by Salon accusing Cosby of assaulting a friend of hers, with whom she subsequently had lost contact. The following month, in a Vanity Fair article, model Beverly Johnson alleged that she was drugged by Cosby during a 1986 audition, and that she knew other women with similar accounts.

Cosby's attorney said Dickinson's account differed from prior accounts she had given of the incident and released a statement that said in part: "Mr. Cosby does not intend to dignify these allegations with any comment." A follow-up statement dismissed the allegations as "unsubstantiated" and an example of "media vilification". A joint statement from Cosby and Constand, who had received a civil settlement in 2006, clarified the statement released a few days prior by stating that it did not refer to Constand's case, which was resolved years ago.

In January 2015, Cindra Ladd alleged that Cosby drugged and sexually assaulted her in 1969. In May 2015, Lili Bernard claimed that Cosby sexually assaulted her in the early 1990s, and that she had been interviewed by police in Atlantic City, New Jersey, regarding the allegation. Because the state of New Jersey has no statute of limitations for rape, Bernard hoped charges would be brought, but media reports noted "it wasn't clear...if what [Bernard] says happened to her happened in New Jersey."

On July 27, 2015, New York magazine's cover featured images of 35 women sitting in chairs with the last chair empty, suggesting there may be more victims who have not come forward yet. The 35 women told "their stories about being assaulted by Bill Cosby, and the culture that wouldn't listen". Eleven other women known to New York who alleged sexual assault by Cosby declined to be photographed and interviewed for the feature. According to Vox, the stories span "more than five decades" and are "remarkably similar, typically involving the comedian offering a woman a cup of coffee or some sort of alcoholic beverage—which may be spiked with drugs—and allegedly sexually assaulting the victim as she's impaired or unconscious."

On September 17, 2015, A&E broadcast the documentary Cosby: The Women Speak, a program in which thirteen alleged victims were interviewed. By October 24, nearly sixty women had claimed they were sexually abused by Cosby, and the terms "sociopath" and "serial rapist" were used to describe him. Jewell Allison, one of Cosby's accusers, described him as a "sociopath" and stated: "We may be looking at America's greatest serial rapist that ever got away with this for the longest amount of time. He got away with it because he was hiding behind the image of Cliff Huxtable."

Table of accusers' allegations
Cosby has been accused by sixty women of rape, drug facilitated sexual assault, sexual battery, or other sexual misconduct. There were also two instances of alleged child sexual abuse, both involving girls 15 years of age. The earliest alleged incidents took place in the mid-1960s, with the rest scattered all the way until the latest in 2008.

Cosby attorney Marty Singer stated, "There is virtually no standard by which the media are holding Mr Cosby's accusers ... Anyone and everyone who wants to file a suit or get on television can be guaranteed fawning coverage. The very same media have demonstrated an unconscionable disinterest in the veracity of his accusers and their motives." Cosby has maintained his innocence and repeatedly denied the allegations. In November 2014, in response to a question about the allegations, Cosby said: "I don't talk about it." Cosby has declined to discuss publicly the accusations in past interviews. However, he told Florida Today: "people shouldn't have to go through that and shouldn't answer to innuendos." In May 2015, he said "I have been in this business 52 years and I've never seen anything like this. Reality is a situation and I can't speak."

* Witness in 2005 Constand civil case
 References For Accuser Table:

Criminal investigations

Constand case

Unsealing of Constand v. Cosby deposition

On July 8, 2015, Constand and her attorney Dolores Troiani filed a motion to negate the confidentiality agreement in the 2005 case against Cosby, claiming Cosby had already engaged in "total abandonment of the confidentiality portions of the agreement" by way of the recent, sweeping denials of all allegations against him. A judge ruled that releasing the sealed documents was justified by Cosby's role as a "public moralist" in contrast to his possible criminal private behavior.

Although some of the files from the Constand case had been unsealed, the transcript of Cosby's several depositions was not among them. Instead, The New York Times had been able to obtain the complete deposition from a court reporting service that had been hired by Constand's attorney and released the document to the general public. After it was discovered that the transcript of the deposition had been released, Cosby's lawyers filed a new motion in the case on July 21, 2015, asserting that Constand and Troiani may have orchestrated the release.

In the court filing condemning the release of the deposition, Cosby's attorneys stressed that none of the testimony that was actually unsealed by a judge stated that he engaged in non-consensual sex or gave anyone Quaaludes without their knowledge or consent. "Reading the media accounts, one would conclude that the Defendant has admitted to rape", the document said. "And yet the Defendant admitted to nothing more than being one of the many people who introduced Quaaludes into their consensual sex life in the 1970s." Cosby's lawyers further contended that a court reporting service hired by Constand had released the 2005 court transcript to the Times, days earlier, in a "massive breach of protocol". The court reporters' code of ethics prohibits the release of testimony without all parties first being contacted.

In the deposition, Cosby denied any sexual assault of any women but admitted he had used sedatives to help gain their cooperation. He testified that he had obtained Quaaludes from gynecologist Leroy Amar, who knew Cosby had no intention of taking the drugs himself. Cosby instead intended to give them to women he wanted to have sexual relations with and admitted he had given the drug to at least one woman and other people. Cosby admitted knowing it was illegal at the time to dispense the drug to other people. Amar would later have his medical license revoked in California and New York State; he died in 2002.

2015 criminal charges

On December 30, 2015, in Montgomery County, Pennsylvania, Cosby was charged with three counts of aggravated indecent assault on Constand as a result of a single incident alleged to have occurred at his home in Cheltenham Township on an unspecified date between mid-January and mid-February 2004 (referred to by media coverage as "January 2004"), according to the very detailed arrest warrant affidavit filed on December 29, 2015. These were the first criminal charges as a result of sexual assault allegations that had been made by many women against Cosby.

Cosby was arraigned that afternoon without entering a plea; his bail was set at $1 million. Cosby surrendered his passport, posted bond, and was escorted to the Cheltenham Township police station to be booked, fingerprinted, and photographed for a mug shot. The charges are based on Constand's statement to police of unwanted sexual contact, though not intercourse, in early 2004, that had been first reported to the Durham Regional Police Service near Constand's home in southern Ontario, Canada, on January 13, 2005; the report was forwarded to authorities in Pennsylvania. On February 17, 2005, the then-district attorney, Bruce Castor, had released a statement that charges would not be brought at that time.

Constand launched a civil lawsuit against Cosby in 2005 which was settled by the defendant in July 2006, on a confidential basis. Some of the testimony from that case was unsealed in July 2015. Based on details revealed in this testimony, along with new interviews with certain witnesses, newly elected District Attorney Kevin Steele decided to file charges on December 30, 2015. The criminal court documents allege that blue pills, said to be Benadryl by Cosby, were given to Constand, who had also been drinking wine during the January 2004 incident.

Cosby's attorney issued a statement saying, "We intend to mount a vigorous defense against this unjustified charge and we expect that Mr. Cosby will be exonerated by a court of law." Cosby's attorneys filed a motion to dismiss the sexual assault charges in January 2016, stating that Castor's office had promised in 2005 that Cosby would not be prosecuted. In testimony involving Cosby's motion to dismiss the charges, Castor defended his decision not to bring charges, citing among other things Constand's year-long delay in reporting the allegations, her continued contact with Cosby, and suggestions that she and her mother might have tried to extort the TV star.

On February 3, 2016, Judge Steven O'Neill ruled "there was no basis" to dismiss the case based on Cosby's assertions. Cosby's legal team sought an appeal before the Superior Court of Pennsylvania; on April 25, 2016, the Superior Court refused to hear Cosby's appeal from the denial of his motion to dismiss the charges, lifted a temporary stay of the pre-trial hearing, and sent the case back to the original court. On April 13, 2016, Cosby filed a motion with the Superior Court to re-seal the deposition from the original Constand lawsuit. His lawyers made a similar request in federal court in Massachusetts earlier, but that motion was denied by Judge David H. Hennessy, who likened these efforts to putting the "toothpaste back in the tube" since Cosby's testimony had already been in the news for months.

At the preliminary hearing on May 24, a judge found that there was enough evidence to proceed with a trial, despite the fact that Constand did not testify, which is allowed under Pennsylvania law. He set a pre-trial hearing for September 6. Cosby appealed this decision based upon the belief his legal team had the right to cross-examine the accuser; he lost this appeal on October 12. The Pennsylvania Supreme Court announced it would review the state law in a separate case, to which Cosby's lead attorney, Brian McMonagle, said he would try to add Cosby's case in hopes of having it thrown out. On September 6, 2016, Judge Steven O'Neill set a trial date for June 6, 2017. On April 12, 2017, the Pennsylvania Supreme Court declined to hear Cosby's appeal to question Constand before the trial.

Cosby had faced a maximum of fifteen to thirty years in prison if found guilty on all three counts and a fine up to $25,000. His trial started on June 5, 2017, and ended in mistrial on June 17.

Judith Huth

On December 16, 2014, after a ten-day investigation, Los Angeles prosecutors declined to file any charges against Cosby after Judith Huth claimed the comedian molested her around 1974 at the Playboy Mansion. Huth had met with Los Angeles police detectives for ninety minutes. In rejecting the case, prosecutors evaluated the charge Cosby would have faced in 1974. Prosecutors took into account legislative changes that extend the statute of limitations for certain crimes but found no way that Cosby could be legally prosecuted.

Lili Bernard

On April 30, 2015, Cuban-American visual artist Lili Bernard filed a sexual assault complaint against Cosby in New Jersey, a state that has no statute of limitations for sexual assault. On July 1, 2015, prosecutors declined to prosecute Cosby because the alleged offense happened before 1996 (the year the law was changed to lift the statute of limitations).

Chloe Goins

From July through October 2015, the Los Angeles Police Department (LAPD) conducted a criminal investigation into Cosby's alleged sexual assault of then 18-year-old model Chloe Goins. The following day, in a statement to ABC News, the LAPD said it will explore any sexual assault accusations against Cosby, including accusations for which the statute of limitations has expired, and referred the case to the Los Angeles County D.A.'s office.

As with nearly all other cases of alleged sexual misconduct by Cosby, the statute of limitations has expired on this 2008 case, according to most experts. Nonetheless, an investigation of the Goins allegations was opened because "LAPD officials said there were many reasons to investigate sexual assault allegations that fall beyond those legal deadlines. Old accusations may lead investigators to more recent incidents with other victims" and Goins would be allowed to testify if charges were laid in any other (more recent) cases. Cosby's former attorney Martin Singer stated he would provide documentary evidence to the LAPD that established Cosby was in New York on August 9, 2008, the date of the incident alleged by Goins.

On January 6, 2016, the Los Angeles District Attorney's office announced that no charge would be laid because they were "blocked by the statute of limitations or lacked sufficient evidence".

First trial

On September 6, 2016, Judge Steven T O'Neill set a trial date in the case of Commonwealth of Pennsylvania vs. William H. Cosby Jr., in which Cosby would be tried for three counts of aggravated indecent assault against Constand. O'Neill set a trial date of June 5, 2017. The judge ruled because Cosby is blind he would need special accommodations during the proceedings. On October 6, Cosby resumed his bid to have his sexual assault case thrown out, arguing that his due process rights were violated. On November 16, O'Neill denied the motion.

Cosby faced a maximum sentence of fifteen to thirty years in prison if found guilty on all three counts and a fine of up to $25,000.

Pretrial motions

Evidentiary motions

On September 6, 2016, the prosecution filed a motion to introduce thirteen other accusers to show a method of operation. Cosby opposed the motion. On February 24, 2017, O'Neill ruled that, out of the other accusers that the prosecution wanted to introduce to show a pattern of alleged criminal sexual behavior by Cosby, only one would be allowed to testify.

The prosecution also moved to introduce into evidence a recorded conversation between Constand's mother Gianna and Cosby discussing the alleged assault. The defense moved to have the deposition from Constand's 2005 civil deposition thrown out. The judge said he would rule on all these motions at a later date. On September 16, O'Neill ruled that the recorded call between Constand's mother and Cosby would be allowed to be played in court. In his ruling he said that since the call was recorded in Canada, which deems recordings lawful with consent from only one party, it would be admissible. On December 5, O'Neill ruled that the deposition in the Constand civil case and any other evidence gathered by using it would be allowed into the trial.

On March 28, 2017, Cosby's defense filed a motion stating that any mention of any other sexual offenses allegedly committed by Cosby should be excluded and that any of Cosby's admissions in his deposition about using Quaaludes or other women he had sex with should also be excluded, even though the judge ruled previously that all information in the deposition would be allowed in court. On March 30, the prosecution opposed this motion and added that comments Cosby made in television interviews with Larry King and in his 1991 book named Childhood about his quest for "Spanish Fly" showed that he was well aware of date rape drugs and that this should also be put into the trial as evidence. On April 28, O'Neill ruled that the use of "Spanish Fly" and any other material from Cosby's book Childhood would not be allowed. He did however rule that his testimony about Quaaludes would be allowed. O'Neill also ruled that the amount of money paid in Constand's lawsuit settlement would be excluded.

Jury selection

On December 30, 2016, Cosby's defense team filed a motion for a change of venue and sought a jury selection from a larger pool outside Montgomery County, arguing that any local jury pool would be tainted given negative media coverage of Cosby. On January 5, 2017, the prosecution wrote that the trial should stay in the county, but they would not object to a jury picked from outside the county. On February 27, 2017, O'Neill ruled that he would allow a jury from outside the county but the trial would remain in Montgomery County; he also ruled the jury would be sequestered. On March 13, the Pennsylvania Supreme Court issued a one-paragraph order setting Allegheny County as the county from which the jury pool would be picked. Allegheny County, which includes Pittsburgh, is the state's second most-populous county.

In March 2017, the defense asked the court to call up 2,000 people as potential jurors. They wished to mail the potential jurors a questionnaire so lawyers could winnow the field of potential jurors. The prosecution objected to Cosby's defense team's requests as to the number of jurors to be questioned, the manner in which they were to be selected, and the timeframe for jury selection, saying Cosby was trying to get special treatment. On April 11, O'Neill denied the defense motions on screening jurors and ruled that jury selection would start on May 22 in Pittsburgh, using the usual procedures of law and lasting up to a week. There would be twelve jurors and six alternates. O'Neill also denied a request by the defense to get extra strikes.

On May 24, 2017, the jury selection process was completed. The jury consisted of one black woman, one black man, six white men, four white women and six alternates.

Jane Doe No. 6

Jane Doe No. 6 was a witness for the prosecution and was the only one of the thirteen Jane Does that O'Neil allowed to testify. She is a black woman who came forward in January 2015 under the alias "Kacey". She claimed that in 1996 Cosby gave her a drug and wine and sexually assaulted her.

Racial bias claims

In a press appearance following a hearing in September 2016, Cosby's lawyers claimed for the first time that racial bias was to blame for the sexual assault charges against their client. In response, prominent criminal defense lawyer commentators, such as Mark Geragos and Carl E. Douglas, stated that this assertion may be an effort to influence potential jurors.

The defense criticized attorney Gloria Allred, who represents several of Cosby's accusers, stating that Allred's "campaign against Mr. Cosby builds on racial bias and prejudice that can pollute the court of public opinion." Allred responded by calling the claim "desperate". She said Cosby "complains about racial bias but what about the African American women whom I represent who accuse him of sexual assault or rape and who refuse to remain silent about what they say they have suffered?" and, "This is not an issue of racial bias. Instead, it is an issue of whether or not Mr. Cosby has committed acts of gender sexual violence."

Declaration of mistrial

On June 17, 2017, O'Neill said the jurors were "hopelessly deadlocked" and declared a mistrial. Reports suggest that the jury deadlocked in a 10–2 vote in favor of convicting Cosby on counts1 (digital penetration without consent) and3 (drugged without knowledge or consent), and was 11–1 in favor of acquittal on count2 (that Constand was unconscious or unaware during the alleged assault).

In an account by NBC News reporter Tracy Connor, an anonymous juror said that when the jury first told the judge it was deadlocked, on June 15, the votes on the three counts were 7–5, 5–7, and 5–6 with one abstention. Two days later, the vote on one of the counts was 10–2, but then several jurors changed their minds, making it a more even split again. It was described as a "true deadlock." On June 23, a juror told CNN that the deadlock was caused in large part by confusion over the contradicting statements made by Constand during testimony. The juror, speaking anonymously, also said the prosecution presented "no real new evidence".

The prosecution announced on the same day of the mistrial that they intended to retry the case.

Second trial

Cosby's second trial was originally set for November 2017, before being delayed to April 2018.

Attorney changes and trial setting

On August 22, 2017, Judge O'Neil granted Cosby's request to change attorneys. Cosby would now be represented by Thomas Mesereau, who was the lead attorney in the 2005 acquittal at Michael Jackson's child molestation trial. Kathleen Bliss and Lane Vines would also represent Cosby. The judge also agreed to postpone the trial until at least March 2018 and accepted the new attorney's request to keep the trial local instead of a change of venue like the first trial.

Key motions

In January 2018, the prosecution asked that nineteen other alleged victims be allowed to testify to show a pattern of similar conduct, which is allowed under Pennsylvania law. The defense filed a motion to have the case dismissed, alleging that Constand did not make the phone calls when she said she did. The defense also asked that a former co-worker be allowed to testify to the fact that she said Constand had told her she could make up a story about sexual misconduct and then sue someone for it. The defense has also asked the case be dismissed on prosecutorial misconduct and claims the statute of limitations has expired as well.

Guilty verdict and sentence

On April 26, 2018, a jury found Bill Cosby guilty of three felony counts of aggravated indecent assault against Constand. The Montgomery County district attorney, Kevin Steele, asked at this point that Cosby's $1million bail be revoked, suggesting that he owned a private plane and could flee. This prompted an angry outburst from Cosby, who shouted, "He doesn't have a plane, you asshole!"; Cosby was ultimately not ruled a flight risk.

On September 25, Cosby was sentenced to three to ten years in prison. He was also ordered to pay the cost of the prosecution against him, $43,611, as well as a $25,000 fine. On that day he was placed in the Montgomery County Correctional Facility in Eagleville, Pennsylvania, and moved to the Pennsylvania Department of Corrections SCI Phoenix in Skippack Township hours afterward.

Appeals

Cosby appealed his conviction, asserting eleven errors in the trial. He argued that the admission of the testimony of five "prior bad act" witnesses was improper, and that these witnesses' testimonies were "too remote in time" and "too dissimilar" to the charges in the trial to be admitted under the rules of evidence. However, on December 10, 2019, Cosby's conviction was upheld by a unanimous three-judge panel in the Superior Court of Pennsylvania, the state's intermediate appellate court. In a 94-page opinion, the court held that the trial court had properly admitted the testimony of five of the nineteen women sought by prosecutors, determining that their testimony suggested a "distinct, signature pattern" in Cosby's "unique sexual assault playbook." Cosby sought a further level of appeal in the Pennsylvania Supreme Court.

On June 23, 2020, the Pennsylvania Supreme Court ruled Cosby would be able to appeal his sexual assault conviction based upon questions on testimony from a witness being more prejudicial than probative. The court will hear his appeal on arguments of it were proper for five prosecution witnesses to testify in the case and include a deposition that Cosby admitted to giving quaaludes to other women in the past. The court also agreed to review whether a former prosecutor informing Cosby that he would not be prosecuted for the assault, resulting in Cosby agreeing to testify in his accuser's civil lawsuit, negatively affected the criminal trial.

The court heard Cosby's appeal on December 1, 2020.

Parole hearings

On May 28, 2021, Cosby's petition for parole was denied. The parole board said in its decision making, that Cosby would not be considered for parole until after he takes his sexually violent treatment program and develops a parole release plan. Also in their decision making, they cited the fact that Cosby was given a negative recommendation by prison officials. Cosby, through his spokesperson Andrew Wyatt, has stated that he will not ever take the sex classes as this would make him look like he was guilty. The parole board said until he takes his classes they will not have another hearing.

Overturned conviction 
On June 30, 2021, the Pennsylvania Supreme Court overturned Cosby's convictions. The decision stated that, prior to testifying in the Constand case, Cosby had been reliant on an unwritten promise that district attorney Bruce Castor had made to not prosecute him. Specifically the ruling concluded that Castor's decision to announce publicly that no prosecution would take place, "was made deliberately to induce the deprivation of a fundamental right"—namely the right not to self-incriminate—thus facilitating a civil lawsuit with compelled testimony, which was believed the victim's only realistic route to justice. As with other prosecutor statements such as plea bargains, this statement was not subject to withdrawal once relied upon, even though it had not been framed as a formal declaration or offer. The court also ruled that the conviction was based on "tainted" testimony, and barred a retrial of the case.

According to the ruling, written by Justice David Wecht, Cosby's 5th Amendment and 14th Amendment rights were violated when he was tried a decade after then-DA Castor issued a press release, carried by multiple major media organizations including CNN and MSNBC, unconditionally stating Cosby would not be prosecuted, with the specific intention to allow a civil court to compel testimony from Cosby and deprive him of the Constitutional right to remain silent so as not to incriminate himself. Cosby was subsequently required to testify during a civil trial that he gave Quaaludes to women before engaging in sexual intercourse, doing so, the majority held, under the belief that he would not be prosecuted over his testimony. There was no documentary evidence that any agreement not to prosecute had been reached, but the majority held that Castor's statement was binding on any district attorney who succeeded him and that Cosby should never have been tried, so it ordered him released immediately. Cosby was promptly released that day.

The decision was not unanimous. Justice Kevin Dougherty, joined by Chief Justice Max Baer, agreed with the four-justice majority that Castor's agreement with Cosby negated the conviction but felt that since the district attorney did not have the statutory or constitutional power to make a non-prosecution agreement binding on his successors, the remedy should have been limited to the suppression of Cosby's deposition in any retrial. Justice Thomas Saylor, dissenting in full, read Castor's press release as simply a statement of what he did have the authority to do: decline prosecution at that time, with the clear implication that he reserved the right to open a prosecution in the future should circumstances change. Saylor did not find Castor's account of his decision-making credible and thus properly rejected by the trial court; he also accepted the trial court's finding that Cosby's decision to testify was not due to the unwritten agreement. He found the testimony of the non-victim witnesses to be more problematic, and would have recommended a new trial with Cosby allowed to challenge that testimony as unduly prejudicial.

District Attorney Kevin Steele said Cosby was released "on a procedural issue that is irrelevant to the facts of the crime" and that he hoped that Cosby's release would not discourage crime victims from reporting sexual assaults because "no one is above the law — including those who are rich, famous and powerful." On the other hand, several criminal defense attorneys argued that the fundamental Constitutional right to due process is more than a technicality.

Prosecution petition to U.S. Supreme Court 

Five months later, at the end of November, Steele's office filed a certiorari petition with the U.S. Supreme Court to hear the case, posing the question as whether the Fourteenth Amendment's protections make a prosecutor's decision not to file charges equivalent to a permanent grant of immunity. Steele cited Justice Dougherty's concurrence as having clearly raised the issue. "The point is not that the Pennsylvania Supreme Court violated its own state laws", the petition said. "The point, rather, is that a reasonably prudent person would have been reckless to rely on a supposed guarantee that the prosecutor did not clearly convey and may not have had the power to grant." It warned that this could make many defendants, in Pennsylvania and elsewhere, who have received such prosecutorial promises claim immunity via the Due Process Clause no matter what evidence emerged against them in the future and that the Court should decide this question of first impression before that issue came to a head.

Cosby's lawyers and spokesmen derided Steele and his office for attempting this last appeal. "[T]he Montgomery County D.A. asks the United States Supreme Court to throw the Constitution out the window, as it did, to satisfy the #metoo mob" said Wyatt in his own statement in response. Cosby lawyer Jennifer Bonjean doubted the Supreme Court would take the case, and said "[i]t seems like a waste of resources and time" to persuade it to. In late January 2022 Bonjean filed a response urging the Supreme Court to decline review. On March 7, 2022, without any noted dissent, the Supreme Court denied the prosecutor's petition, making the decision of the state supreme court final.

Civil lawsuits against Cosby

As of November 13, 2015, there were nine lawsuits pending against Cosby. Huth and Goins were both suing the actor for damages related to their alleged sexual assaults. Although the statute of limitations has run out for most other accusers to sue directly for their alleged assault, multiple accusers have filed defamation lawsuits claiming that Cosby had kept calling them liars throughout 2014. Dickinson, Hill, Ruehli, and McKee have filed individual lawsuits. Green, Serignese, Traitz, Bowman, Tarshis, Moritz, and Leslie are also involved in a combined lawsuit against Cosby. Most lawsuits that are active are currently on hold awaiting the outcome of his criminal trial. Some are still allowed to file motions and depose witnesses, with the exception of Cosby himself. Most judges have indicated that a civil trial will not take place until after the criminal trial.

In 2005, Constand sued Cosby. The parties settled the case on confidential terms in 2006. In July 2015, after portions of the sealed deposition were released, Cosby released a statement saying the "only reason" why he settled "was because it would have been embarrassing in those days to put all those women on the stand, and his family had no clue." During summer 2015, both Cosby's legal team and Constand's lawyer Troiani filed motions accusing the other party of having broken the confidentiality agreement that was part of the 2006 settlement. The primary issue alleged by Cosby was that a court reporter released the full transcript of his deposition, blaming Troiani for this act and seeking sanctions against Troiani. A federal judge had unsealed portions of the evidence from the 2005 lawsuit, but that did not include Cosby's statements made under oath.

The significance of the availability of the deposition is that it contains admissions made by Cosby about his tactics in dealing with other women, including the use of "powerful sedatives [including Quaaludes] in a calculated pursuit of young women", according to a New York Times summary. The transcript of the full testimony was obtained by the Times from a court reporting service, where it was publicly available. The significance of the availability of Cosby's deposition from the Constand case is that plaintiffs in other cases against Cosby, such as the Green, et al. defamation suit, might be allowed by judges to use the transcript's contents as evidence now that its contents are widely known in the public.

Thirty-three of the accusers were represented by Allred. One accuser, Dickinson, was represented by Allred's daughter, Lisa Bloom. On December 11, 2015, Allred stated in an interview with Philadelphia magazine that more alleged victims would be coming forward. She said, "More women have contacted me who have not yet spoken out publicly, some of whom may do so in the future and some of whom have chosen not to do so. They wanted me to know the information that they had so it would be of assistance to us and our victim. There are definitely more women who wish to speak out in the future who allege that they are victims of Mr. Cosby."

Andrea Constand

Constand filed a civil claim in March 2005, with thirteen women as potential witnesses if the case went to court. Cosby settled out of court for an undisclosed amount in November 2006. In a July 2005 Philadelphia Daily News interview, Beth Ferrier, one of the anonymous "Jane Doe" witnesses in the Constand case, alleged that in 1984 Cosby drugged her coffee and she awoke with her clothes partially removed. After learning that charges were not pursued in the case, Green, the only publicly named woman in the prior case, came forward with allegations in February 2005 that Cosby had drugged and assaulted her in the 1970s. Cosby's lawyer said he did not know her and the events did not happen. It was revealed in 2018 that Cosby had settled with Constand for $3.4 million.

Tamara Green, et al.

Green filed a lawsuit against Cosby and his representatives in December 2014, claiming that the continued denials amounted to publicly branding her as a liar, resulting in defamation of character. Green's lawsuit was filed in Cosby's home state of Massachusetts. In January 2015, the lawsuit was amended to allow fellow accusers Traitz and Serignese to be added as co-plaintiffs. Singer had released a statement specifically targeting Traitz after she posted allegations against Cosby on Facebook in November, calling her story "ridiculous", "absurd", and "utter nonsense". No such denials were leveled explicitly at Serignese, but she claims the sweeping denials against all Cosby's accusers included her and have damaged her reputation as well.

On October 20, 2015, American International Group (AIG) filed legal papers to try to put a stay on the litigation, pending a court declaration of whether the insurance company had a duty to defend Cosby as well as pay for any actual damages won. AIG Property Casualty Company claimed that Cosby's policy did not cover the liability he is currently facing in the lawsuit—but that they have nonetheless been funding Cosby's legal defense "at a considerable cost".

On November 13, 2015, it was reported that four more women—Bowman, Tarshis, Moritz, and Leslie—had joined the lawsuit as additional plaintiffs. Bowman, Tarshis, and Leslie are co-represented by Chicago attorney Michael Bressler. Lawyers for Cosby declined to comment. On December 14, Cosby filed a countersuit for defamation against all the plaintiffs, claiming that they had "malicious, opportunistic and false and defamatory accusations of sexual misconduct against him". He also claims each defendant "knowingly published false statements and accusations". Cosby asked the court to award him unspecified damages and to require that public retractions be made by the women.

On February 19, 2016, Cosby's wife Camille was deposed by plaintiffs after unsuccessfully attempting to stop the deposition. U.S. Magistrate Judge Mark G. Mastroianni ruled that she could refuse to answer questions about private conversations with her husband. A transcript of the "extremely contentious" deposition was released in May 2016; Camille relied heavily on the marital privilege in refusing to respond to many questions. The deposition was interrupted twice as the parties called U.S. District Judge David H. Hennessy to resolve disputes. After the deposition was halted, the court ordered Camille to sit for a second deposition.

Lawyers representing the alleged victims planned on deposing Quincy Jones, who, as a friend and collaborator of Cosby for more than fifty years, may have had information vital to the plaintiffs' case. In addition to Jones, plaintiffs intend to depose or subpoena documents from William Morris Endeavor, Cosby's former attorneys Singer and Schmitt, and his publicist David Brokaw.

On March 21, 2016, Judge Anita Brody granted some access to the case file of Constand's lawyer, even though she settled in a confidential agreement with Cosby in 2006. However, Brody did limit the release of the case file to materials pertaining to the seven women plaintiffs and other witnesses. On September 28, Cammaratta filed a motion stating that Cosby violated rules of civil procedure. The motion asked for the judge to rule that Cosby was personally responsible for the defamation said by his spokespeople and the publication of such materials; and that he should also be liable for causing the plaintiffs' emotional distress from these comments.

Janice Dickinson

Dickinson brought forth a similar defamation lawsuit against Cosby in May 2015, filed in California. According to Bloom, "Calling Dickinson a liar is a defamatory statement under the law... and that's the mistake Bill Cosby made." Later court filings included sworn statements from friends and colleagues who confirmed that Dickinson provided a consistent story for many years about her alleged abuse. Pablo Fenjves, Dickinson's ghostwriter, as well as former ReganBooks president Judith Regan, both asserted that Dickinson came forward with her allegations for her 2002 autobiography, but they were not included in the book because ReganBooks' parent company HarperCollins was afraid of being sued by Cosby.

On November 2, 2015, Los Angeles Superior Court Judge Debre Katz Weintraub ruled Cosby and Singer must give depositions despite their efforts to have the case thrown out (Singer was not named as a defendant in the case). The ruling stated Dickinson's lawyers could seek answers only as to whether the denials were made maliciously, and Cosby and Singer could assert attorney–client privilege and refuse to answer some questions. Singer was scheduled to be deposed November 19 in Los Angeles, with Cosby's deposition occurring on November 23 in Boston. On November 12, a California appeals court temporarily halted an order requiring them to testify. Both parties are required to provide information by the end of the month to state their cases as to why or why not the deposition should proceed. "We are confident that once the Court of Appeals hears full argument on the issues it will allow the deposition of Mr. Cosby and his attorney to go forward," Bloom wrote in an email. Singer announced that he was planning on "pursuing claims against Janice Dickinson and Lisa Bloom after I prevail in this action."

Dickinson later amended her complaint to name Singer as a co-defendant, alleging that after she made her allegations on CNN, he prepared four press releases denying that Cosby drugged and raped her, and calling the woman's allegations "fabricated" and "an outrageous defamatory lie". Singer was later replaced as Cosby's counsel by Christopher Tayback of Quinn Emanuel. In February 2016, Judge Weintraub granted a motion by the defense to dismiss Singer as a defendant in the lawsuit. On March 29, Weintraub denied Cosby's motion to dismiss the case, allowing the case to proceed to a jury trial. Shortly after the ruling, Dickinson said, "I want Bill Cosby in court, I want him to stand under oath."

On November 21, 2017, in a major blow to both Cosby and Singer, a California appeals court reversed two other courts' decisions to remove Singer as a co-defendant and added him back. In their ruling they stated that Singer and Cosby's anti-SLAPP motion was meritless. In March 2018, after a last-ditch effort to get the case against Cosby and Singer dismissed, the California Supreme Court declined to intervene and hear arguments on the case.

In July, 2019, Bill Cosby's insurance company, AIG, settled the lawsuit for an undisclosed amount."

Chloe Goins

On October 6, 2015, Goins filed a lawsuit against Cosby. In her complaint, she stated that Cosby had assaulted her, causing her to suffer "emotional distress", "psychiatric trauma", and impairment of her education. Goins's lawyer, Spencer Kuvin, said his client's number-one priority was that the truth come out and Cosby be criminally prosecuted. Singer stated he would provide documentary evidence to the LAPD that established Cosby was in New York on August 9, 2008, the date of the alleged incident. Although the prosecutor's office had considered filing criminal charges, the charges were dropped because the statute of limitations had expired and a lack of sufficient evidence.

In February 2016, Goins dismissed her lawsuit without prejudice. In May 2016, she refiled the suit, adding Hefner as a co-defendant. The judge denied Cosby's request to dismiss and set the trial to start sometime in June 2018.

Renita Hill

Hill claims that Cosby gave her a bit part on television, funded her college education and pledged to assist her career, all while sporadically sexually abusing her from 1983 to 1987. In October 2015, she filed a defamation suit against Cosby, Singer and Camille Cosby, alleging defamation, false light, and intentional infliction of emotional distress. Cosby's attorneys removed the case from state to federal court and moved the court to dismiss the suit in late December 2015, arguing that Cosby's denials were opinions protected under the First Amendment. Hill's attorneys responded that Cosby's denials were published facts and hence are defamatory and not covered by First Amendment protections.

The U.S. District Court dismissed the suit "with prejudice" in January 2016, meaning the suit cannot be re-filed. Judge Arthur Schwab decided that statements made by Cosby and his attorneys were opinions protected by the First Amendment. In April 2016, Hill filed an appeal with the U.S. Court of Appeals for the Third Circuit.

Kristina Ruehli

On November 9, 2015, Ruehli filed a defamation lawsuit against Cosby for denying her claims of rape. Ruehli's allegations against Cosby date back the furthest, with claims that he assaulted her in 1965. She claimed Cosby's vehement denials leveled against the numerous accusers in 2014 were grounds for defamation. Her complaint states, in part, "It is one thing for an accused sexual assailant to remain silent and allow the legal process, or public opinion, to run its course, but it is quite another for him to unleash his agents to deny that he attacked the plaintiff and other women, to invite others to republish his statements, and to brand them as unreliable liars." In an account from The New York Times, Ruehli has dropped her lawsuit without prejudice as of June 24, 2016.

Katherine McKee

On December 22, 2015, McKee, a former girlfriend of the late entertainer Sammy Davis Jr., sued Cosby for defamation over claims he and his attorney made about her allegation of being raped by Cosby in a Detroit hotel room in the early 1970s. Judge Mastroianni dismissed the lawsuit on February 16, 2017, on the basis of the landmark Supreme Court case New York Times Co. v. Sullivan in 1964, which required a higher standard to show the intent of malice towards a public figure to qualify as defamatory, and that given that her lawsuit, McKee was a limited public figure. Mckee appealed, but a federal appeals court refused to reverse Mastroianni's decision to dismiss the lawsuit on December 18, 2017. On October 8, 2017, McKee's appeal was again dismissed; Judge Sandra Lynch cited, "McKee took concerted steps meant to influence the public's perception of whether Cosby was, in fact, a sexual predator," thus rendering herself a public figure. In January 2018, The U.S. Court of Appeals for the First Circuit refused to rehear her case in a full court hearing. On petition to the Supreme Court, the Court declined to hear the case in February 2019, re-asserting that the New York Times Co. decision was properly applied at all levels.

Judith Huth

In December 2014, Huth filed a lawsuit alleging sexual assault in 1974 at the Playboy Mansion when she was 15 years old. It was one of two active lawsuits against Cosby directly alleging sexual assault. Even though the incident occurred more than forty years previously, California laws allow alleged child sexual abuse victims to bring their cases forward as an adult. Cosby countersued both Huth and her attorney Marc Strecker for legal fees. Cosby's attorney contended Huth and her attorney engaged in an extortion attempt before filing a suit. Singer's claim was made in a notice of demurrer. He also sought sanctions against Huth and Strecker.

On August 4, 2015, a Los Angeles Superior Court judge ordered Cosby to give a sworn deposition in the lawsuit. Another judge refused to dismiss Huth's suit against Cosby and required him to provide a deposition, which was held on October9 in Boston and lasted 7.5 hours; no further details have been made public. The deposition was sealed until at least December 22, 2015. Allred announced that she would be seeking to depose Cosby again.

Huth was scheduled to give her deposition for Cosby's attorneys on January 29, 2016. However, on March 30, Los Angeles Superior Court Judge Craig D. Karlan granted a temporary delay of Cosby's second deposition and any further depositions of Huth. Judge Karlan did, however, rule that both sides could continue depositions of other people. Allred said she and partner John West planned to take depositions from other women who claim they were abused by Cosby when they were underage, and others. Allred was scheduled to give a deposition of Hill, who claimed Cosby sexually assaulted her when she was 16 years old, on April 8. Allred also announced that she would be deposing Hugh Hefner sometime in April.

On April 14, 2016, Cosby's lawyers filed a motion to dismiss Huth's lawsuit claiming that she changed her timeline regarding her "delayed discovery" of psychological injury or illness related to the alleged abuse. On April 26, Judge Karlan refused to dismiss the majority of Huth's lawsuit; however, he did dismiss a "negligent infliction of emotional distress" claim. "The court is not, at this time, willing to dismiss plaintiff's potentially meritorious claims against defendant based upon mistakes attributable to her former counsel," Karlan wrote. Allred said "We are very happy that the Court agreed and we will continue to vigorously fight for a just result for our client." Cosby's spokesperson, Monique Pressley, did not immediately comment on the decision.

On September 20, it was revealed that one of the thirteen prosecution witnesses in the criminal trial was alleged Cosby victim Margie Shapiro. Allred filed a motion in the Huth civil case to have the deposition of Shapiro postponed until after the criminal trial. Allred stated she believed the defense would try to use the deposition against Shapiro to find discrepancies in the upcoming trial. Cosby attorney Angela Agrusa opposed this motion. On June 27, 2017, Judge Karlan set a trial start date for July 30, 2018.

Two months after Cosby was released from a Pennsylvania prison, the case was revived, and his lawyer said he would continue to plead the 5th. The Los Angeles Superior Court has decided that civil trial could go forward with a tentative date of April 18, 2022. On March 16, Cosby's lawyers filed court papers that alleged that the statute violated the constitution's ex post facto law. Two days later, Huth's and Cosby's lawyers had a heated meeting to decide the fate of the lawsuit. Defense lawyer Jennifer Bonjean said that they haven't made a decision yet but they were looking for a fair trial somewhere in May. The trial then began setting up the jury on the week of May 23rd to 28th, and the trial itself is expected to take two weeks to finish. Opening arguments were scheduled for June 1st.

On June 7th 2022, Huth testified to a jury in the civil trial, recalling the events that happened in the Playboy Mansion. Notably, photos of Cosby with a beard posing with her dates back to 1975, meaning that the incident occurred on that year. A day later, Cosby denied these events, saying "I don't know Ms. Huth". He was not expected to attend the trial. On June 21, 2022, the California civil jury ruled in favor of Huth, with Cosby ordered to pay $500,000 and no punitive damages.

Lili Bernard

On October 14, 2021, Actress Lili Bernard filed a lawsuit under the state of New Jersey 2 year look back period, which allows victims of sexual assault to sue regardless of when the offense took place. In her lawsuit she claims that Cosby had sexually assaulted her on multiple occasions with the most serious allegation happening in August 1990 in which she claims that Cosby lured her to the Trump Taj Mahal resort in Atlantic City, NJ with a promise to help advance her career but instead, drugged and raped her. She then goes on to say that after she woke up the next morning, Cosby threatened her and said that if she were to go to the police, that he would sue her for defamation and would destroy her career. She is seeking $225 million in damages which includes $25 million per sexual assault and another $125 million for punitive damages. Cosby through his spokesman Andrew Wyatt, has vehemently denied her accusations and has said he would fight the 2 year look back window claiming it to be unconstitutional.

Related litigation

Suit against Cosby attorney

On November 16, 2015, it was reported that accusers Green and Bowman filed a joint lawsuit against John Schmitt, one of Bill Cosby's lawyers. In November 2014, Schmitt released a statement reading, "Over the last several weeks, decade-old, discredited allegations against Mr. Cosby have resurfaced. The fact they are being repeated does not make them true. Mr. Cosby does not intend to dignify these allegations with any comment." This statement was also posted to the front page of Cosby's official website. Green and Bowman contend that this widely circulated statement amounted to branding them as liars, resulting in emotional distress and other damages.

Insurance coverage dispute

AIG Property Casualty Company, Cosby's homeowner's insurance, has tentatively agreed to pick up Cosby's legal costs for the Green, et al. case in Massachusetts, as well as for Dickinson's case in California, over whether these women were defamed when Cosby's representatives denied the occurrence of sexual misconduct. But the insurer has also filed lawsuits related to both cases, aiming for declaratory relief that it is not responsible.

Cosby's homeowners insurance does cover him for "personal injury", which is defined in his policy as including "bodily injury"; "shock, emotional distress, mental injury"; "invasion of privacy"; and "defamation, libel, or slander". However, the policy contains an exclusion for "sexual, physical or mental abuse", setting the stage for a potentially novel legal battle over whether a defamation claim about the denial of sexual abuse is covered.

In September 2015, Cosby filed a motion to either dismiss AIG's lawsuit or put it on hold. Cosby's attorneys argued that AIG was acting against Cosby's best interests and that fighting both the lawsuits from the accusers as well as from his insurance company would drain his resources.

On October 9, 2015, AIG filed a response, calling Cosby's motion "bizarre and possibly unique in the entire history of American jurisprudence", criticizing Cosby's lawyers for referencing irrelevant case law from other states, and saying that if the court sided with Cosby, it "would amount to a wholesale abandonment of this Court's jurisdiction, all for no apparent reason."

On November 13, 2015, California Federal Judge Beverly O'Connell granted Cosby's motion to dismiss in the Dickinson case and concluded that AIG had a duty to defend. In her opinion, O'Connell looked at the "arising out of" exclusion noted above and declares the meaning is ambiguous. "The Court finds that both Plaintiff's broad interpretation and Defendant's narrow interpretation of 'arising out of' are reasonable... The sexual misconduct exclusion could reasonably be read to require that Dickinson's claims merely relate to sexual misconduct, or that Dickinson's claims be proximately caused by the sexual misconduct", she wrote.

Since ambiguous terms are interpreted in favor of finding coverage, Cosby prevailed. O'Connell gave a second independent reason for finding in Cosby's favor. She looked at the Dickinson complaint and concluded that there are allegations independent of sexual misconduct. "For example, allegations that Defendant 'intentionally drugged' Dickinson 'even though he knew that she had been in a rehab center for addiction a few months before' could reasonably be interpreted as independent of sexual misconduct, and therefore, within the Policies' coverage... Similarly, the Dickinson Complaint alleges that Defendant's statements contain numerous implications about Dickinson, including the implication that 'Dickinson has copied the claims made publicly by other women against Defendant' and 'the implication that Ms. Dickinson's rape disclosure is a lie and that therefore she is a liar'", she wrote. As courts impose coverage in a "mixed" action, Cosby prevailed here as well but this ruling does not apply to the Massachusetts case, where AIG and Cosby are still fighting to determine who is liable. AIG plans to appeal this ruling.

Judge, Mark G. Mastroianni, denied Cosby's bid to dismiss or pause the AIG suit on December 14, 2015. This judge, also responsible for the Green et al. defamation suit, denied AIG's motion to pause that case.

Gloria Allred vs. Cobb-Marietta Coliseum, et al.

On November 18, 2015, Allred announced she was suing Cobb County, Georgia; Cobb-Marietta Coliseum; and Michael Taormina for violating her First Amendment rights when she was denied entry to Cosby's stand-up comedy performance on May 2, 2015, at the Cobb Energy Performing Arts Center in Atlanta. Allred participated in a protest outside of the venue, but had also purchased a ticket to the show. Nevertheless, local police officers told her she would be arrested for trespassing if she entered the theater. Allred said Cosby's team coordinated with security and police to deny entry to individuals they had placed on a list of "agitators". Cobb-Marietta Coliseum is the name of the company that organized the show, and Taormina is its managing director. The police officers are employed by Cobb County.

"Performers should not be able to commandeer a police force (as Bill Cosby's representatives appeared to do) in order to exclude individuals from the performance because they have a different viewpoint than the performer has", Allred said. She sought a court order to prohibit what she calls the venue's "censorship policy on admissions".

On September 8, 2016, Allred reached a settlement with the defense. They agreed to pay Allred $40,000, along with a promise not to block any future customers from attending any public event held at the Coliseum.

Andrea Constand vs. Bruce Castor

On October 26, 2015, Andrea Constand filed a federal lawsuit against former Montgomery County District Attorney Bruce Castor for defamation. Constand is being represented by her original 2006 Constand vs Cosby attorney Dolores Troiani.

Cosby's lead criminal lawyer in Pennsylvania is fighting a subpoena related to his $2,500 donation to the ex-prosecutor who says he had promised Cosby he would never be charged. Lawyer Brian McMonagle co-hosted a political fundraiser for former District Attorney Bruce Castor early last year but said it took place months before he joined Cosby's defense team in September. Constand's lawyer now wants McMonagle to detail any ties between his office and Castor, including phone records and documents. She wants Cosby to do the same. At a pretrial hearing on April 15, 2016, a judge ruled that Constand is entitled to any documents shared between Castor and Cosby's attorneys. In January 2019, the two sides reached a confidential settlement.

Bill Cosby vs. Beverly Johnson

On December 21, 2015, Cosby sued supermodel Beverly Johnson for defamation, claiming that she told a false story in a Vanity Fair article. This was the first time Cosby had sued a woman who has claimed assault without being sued himself first. Cosby's lawsuit accuses Johnson of lying about the incident in which she says Cosby spiked a cup of cappuccino with an unknown drug. Realizing what was happening, Johnson said she screamed and cursed at him several times before Cosby dragged her out and hailed a cab for her. (No sexual contact by Cosby was alleged in Johnson's version of the event.) Allegedly, she also repeated the story in subsequent interviews and in her memoirs, released on August 25, 2015.

Cosby's lawsuit seeks unspecified damages and an injunction preventing the model from repeating her claims and requests they be removed from Johnson's memoir, which was released in August.

On February 19, 2016, Cosby filed a motion to dismiss his lawsuit against Johnson. His attorney Monique Pressley wrote in an email that Cosby made the move to focus on his defense in a criminal case in Pennsylvania. Pressley wrote that Cosby plans to re-file the case against Johnson before the statute of limitations expires.  No such refiling occurred.

Bill Cosby vs. Andrea Constand, Constand's mother, Constand's attorneys and National Enquirer

On February 1, 2016, Cosby filed a breach-of-contract lawsuit against Andrea Constand, her mother Gianna Constand, her current lawyer Dolores Troiani, her former lawyer Bebe Kivitz and the publisher of the National Enquirer. Cosby filed the lawsuit a day before the February2 criminal court hearing that included testimony from Troiani. The lawsuit seeks full repayment plus interest on "the substantial financial benefit". The filing states "Despite being expressly prohibited from disclosing such information to anyone, Andrea Constand volunteered to participate and disclosed such information to the district attorney and others." Troiani has maintained that the settlement agreement barred Constand only from initiating criminal proceedings against Cosby and not from cooperating if authorities came to her first. Prosecutors introduced a copy of the agreement, redacted to hide all but a single sentence, at Cosby's pretrial hearing this month. That line read: "Constand agrees that she will not initiate any criminal complaint against Cosby arising from the underlying facts of this case." The lawsuit currently remains under seal and Cosby's lawyers have declined to comment on the nature of the allegations in it.

On July 28, 2016, Cosby filed a motion to dismiss his entire lawsuit against all the defendants.

Bruce Castor vs. Andrea Constand

On October 20, 2017, Bruce Castor's attorney, James Beasley Jr., announced that he plans to file a lawsuit against Andrea Constand for damages suffered as a result of the election in which he lost to Kevin Steele who is now prosecuting Cosby for the same acts Castor would not prosecute him for. In his suit he claims that Constand conspired with Steele to help him win the election so Cosby could be prosecuted.
Constand's attorney, Jeffrey McCarron, responded by saying "If his described basis is the reason for the lawsuit, then we do not expect it will last very long."

Reactions

Defenses of Cosby

In 2014, Camille Cosby, who married Cosby in 1964 when she was 19, released a statement supporting her husband, describing him as a victim of unvetted accusations: "The man I met, and fell in love with, and whom I continue to love, is the man you all knew through his work. He is a kind man... and a wonderful husband, father and friend."

In a January 2015 Time magazine article about why black women should stop defending Cosby, actress Phylicia Rashad is quoted defending him: "What you're seeing is the destruction of a legacy. And I think it's orchestrated. I don't know why or who's doing it, but it's the legacy. And it's a legacy that is so important to the culture."

In a July 2015 USA Today article about how the actors of The Cosby Show responded to the allegations, Keshia Knight Pulliam of the cast stated "All I can speak to is the man I know and I love the fact that he has been such an example [and] you can't take away from the great that he has done, the millions and millions of dollars he has given back to colleges and education, and just what he did with the Cosby Show and how groundbreaking that was. The Cosbys, we were the first family that no matter what race, religion, you saw yourself in", further addressing the charges against Cosby. "At the end of the day they are allegations... I don't have that story to tell."

In September 2015, comedian Damon Wayans attacked the accusers, calling them "un-rape-able", and defended Cosby by stating "It's a money hustle."

In December 2015, actor and comedian Eddie Griffin suggested that Cosby was the victim of a conspiracy to destroy his image and that several other prominent African-American men had been victims of similar conspiracies.

Chicago Tribune columnist Clarence Page writes that the most popular conspiracy theory regarding the allegations involves Cosby being "[punished] by the powers-that-be for [his] attempts to buy NBC in the 1990s". Page wrote that the conspiracy does not explain why the conspirators waited so long to bring forth the accusations, with the scandal unfolding many years after Cosby abandoned the purchase. Dick Gregory was a supporter of this theory.

Defenders change their minds
Two notable people who previously defended Cosby and believed in his innocence, changed their minds. American actress and talk show host Whoopi Goldberg and Joseph C. Phillips (a Cosby Show regular for three years) each made public statements on July 15, 2015. Goldberg said "If this is to be tried in the court of public opinion, I got to say all of the information that's out there kind of points to guilt." In an interview, Goldberg had a message for Cosby: "It looks bad, Bill. Either speak up or shut up." Goldberg had received threats for staunchly standing by Cosby. Goldberg, in the form of a question, referred to Cosby as a "serial rapist" and questioned why he was still on the streets. Phillips was more direct in a separate comment from Goldberg, saying "Of course Bill Cosby is guilty!"

Obama reaction
In July 2015 PAVE: Promoting Awareness and Victim Empowerment, a nonprofit group focusing on sexual assault prevention, launched a WhiteHouse.gov petition, calling upon President Barack Obama to revoke Cosby's Presidential Medal of Freedom (which Cosby received from President George W. Bush in July 2002). Later the same month, in response to a question at a news conference, President Obama said:

Cosby's response
After Tamara Green, one of the witnesses in Andrea Constand's case, re-told her story to Newsweek in February 2014, Cosby's publicist David Brokaw issued a statement at the time calling Green's story a "10-year discredited accusation that proved to be nothing at the time, and is still nothing." When the sexual assault claims against Cosby exploded at the end of 2014, denials by Brokaw and other Cosby representatives became even more vehement, with lawyer Martin Singer calling all the allegations "unsubstantiated, fantastical stories... [that] have escalated past the point of absurdity".

When Dickinson came forward in November 2014 to accuse Cosby of raping her in 1982, Singer issued a denial on behalf of Cosby, saying, "Janice Dickinson's story accusing Bill Cosby of rape is a lie."

Around the time of these interviews, Cosby's lawyers began sending sharply worded letters to publications that wrote about the sexual assault allegations, threatening them with legal action and using phrases like "proceed at your own peril" if they published certain stories. News outlets published the threatening letters from Cosby's attorneys.

In November 2014, one of Cosby's lawyers, John Schmitt, released a statement reading, "Over the last several weeks, decade-old, discredited allegations against Mr. Cosby have resurfaced. The fact they are being repeated does not make them true. Mr. Cosby does not intend to dignify these allegations with any comment." This statement was also posted to the front page of Cosby's official website.

Subsequent to his arraignment on three felony charges based on the Constand case, Cosby tweeted the following message on December 30, 2015, using his Twitter account: "Friends and fans, Thank You ."

Interviews
Cosby was asked directly about Buress's comments and the resulting fallout in two November 2014 interviews, which were originally intended to be about a new art exhibit at the Smithsonian that featured his private collection of African American art. In an NPR interview on November 15, 2014, reporter Scott Simon said: "This question gives me no pleasure, Mr. Cosby, but there have been serious allegations raised about you in recent days." Cosby became silent, leading to an awkward radio exchange in which Simon verbally described Cosby's actions to listeners: "you're shaking your head no." Simon continued asking Cosby to comment on the allegations before finally wrapping up the interview with no further communication from Cosby. In a November 6, 2014, interview with Associated Press reporter Brett Zongker, Cosby appeared visibly rattled by unexpected Buress questions and told Zongker, "No, no, we don't answer that." In the following recorded minutes, Cosby repeatedly attempted to get Zongker to confirm that the AP would edit out the Buress questions, implying that Zongker's "integrity" and ability to be a "serious reporter" would be compromised if that portion of the interview was not "scuttled". When Zongker failed to guarantee this request, Cosby turned to his off-camera publicist David Brokaw and told him to get on the phone with Zongker's editors "immediately". When the interview was first released on November 10, the Buress questions had indeed been omitted. However, after the allegations continued to gain new traction, including a new accusation from Janice Dickinson, the AP decided to release footage of the full exchange on November 19.

In a November 21, 2014, Florida Today interview, Cosby stated: "I know people are tired of me not saying anything, but a guy doesn't have to answer to innuendos. People should fact check. People shouldn't have to go through that and shouldn't answer to innuendos."

Fallout
Numerous institutions, colleges, universities, businesses, and broadcast networks have severed ties with Cosby as a result of the allegations.

Cosby's honorary degrees have been the subject of controversy. It is estimated that the comedian received more than 60 honorary degrees between 1985 and 2014, many of which were conferred after Cosby admitted to funneling money to mistress Shawn Upshaw in the 1990s, was accused of sexually assaulting Lachele Covington in 2000, and faced a sexual abuse lawsuit in 2005 by Andrea Constand with 13 other alleged victims prepared to come forward. Nevertheless, Cosby continued to collect honorary degrees, up until Boston University granted the honor to him in May 2014. The University of Arizona was still in discussions as late as November 2014 to award a degree to Cosby in 2015.

However, as the Cosby controversy continued to unfold, there was an increasing movement to draw attention to sexual violence on college campuses, with growing criticism that the bureaucracy of higher education led to a culture where sexual crimes were not taken seriously. New York magazine referred to the movement in 2014 as a "revolution against campus sexual assault". It became so prevalent that Vice President Joe Biden released an op-ed in 2015 to combat the issue. It was against this backdrop that numerous colleges and universities began to sever their ties with Cosby, with an unprecedented number of them rescinding his honorary degrees.

When announcing their condemnation of Cosby, many universities used the opportunity to voice strong no-tolerance policies of sexual violence of any kind. Brown University said Cosby's alleged actions were "particularly troubling as our university community continues to confront the very real challenges of sexual violence on our campus and in society at large." In Baylor University's statement announcing Cosby's rescinded degree, it added, "Through the efforts of our Title IX Office, we are encouraging victims to report acts of interpersonal and sexual violence, and making sure those suffering from the effects of such acts are provided the necessary support and services to feel safe and be academically successful."

After more than 20 institutions rescinded Cosby's degrees, several others refused to do so, often citing their policy never to rescind anyone's degree for any reason. Most of these schools nevertheless included statements abhorring Cosby's conduct.

University of Pennsylvania received some of the greatest backlash when it announced it would not rescind Cosby's honorary degree because of university policy. It made no comment to the fact that Penn previously had rescinded two other honorary degrees. Philadelphia magazine published an op-ed titled "Penn, Are You Serious About Not Revoking Bill Cosby's Honorary Degree?" summarizing "On a campus where 27 percent of women report being sexually assaulted, the hesitation is unacceptable." University of Pennsylvania eventually rescinded Cosby's honorary degree in February 2018.

Institutions sever ties
In November 2014, colleges and universities with ties to Cosby began removing their affiliations with him. The University of Massachusetts Amherst, one of Cosby's alma maters, asked Cosby to step down as an honorary co-chairman of the university's fundraising campaign. The Berklee College of Music, which had previously awarded Cosby with an honorary degree, got rid of a scholarship that it offered in Cosby's name. High Point University in North Carolina also pulled Cosby from its advisory board, and Freed–Hardeman University rescinded its invitation for Cosby to appear at an annual dinner in December.

On December 4, 2014, the United States Navy took the rare step of revoking Cosby's honorary title of chief petty officer, which he had received in 2011. The Navy released a statement saying the "allegations against Mr. Cosby are very serious and are in conflict with the Navy's core values of honor, courage and commitment."

In December 2014, amid pressure to cut long-term ties with Temple University, Cosby resigned from the board of trustees.

On December 14, 2014, Spelman College indefinitely suspended its Camille Olivia Hanks Cosby Endowed Professorship, named after Cosby's wife. The college said it would restore the endowed professorship when its "original goals can again be met", but after Cosby's 2005 deposition became public in July 2015, Spelman discontinued the professorship entirely.

By the end of 2014, Creative Artists Agency dropped Cosby as a client, leaving him without a Hollywood agent.

On July 7, 2015, Walt Disney World removed a statue of Bill Cosby that had been featured as part of the Hollywood Studios park's "Academy of Television Arts and Sciences Hall of Fame Plaza".

In mid-July 2015, after enormous public pressure to remove art work owned by Cosby, the Smithsonian's National Museum of African Art decided to post a disclaimer reminding visitors that an exhibition featuring Cosby's art collection is about the artists, not a tribute to the embattled comedian. The critically panned show, which had been planned since 2012 and partly underwritten by $716,000 in tax-deductible donations to the museum by Bill and Camille Cosby (who sits on the NMAA's board), is titled "Conversations" and includes 62 works lent by the couple. It ran until January 24, 2016.

On July 20, 2015, it was announced that Cosby would no longer appear in the upcoming documentary Painted Down, about the history of African American stuntmen in film and television. Cosby is credited with helping to create the Black Stuntmen's Association in 1967. Producer Nonie Robinson claimed, "We were the last project standing behind him," but said that pulling him from the documentary was "the right thing to do in light of the recent court deposition being made public." At the same time, The Black Stuntmen's Association removed a tribute to Cosby on its website.

On July 23, 2015, Simon & Schuster confirmed to the Associated Press that it would not be releasing a paperback version of the Cosby-approved 2014 biography Cosby: His Life and Times, which gained criticism for not addressing the then-few public sexual assault allegations against Cosby. The publisher also pulled celebrity endorsements for the book after David Letterman and Jerry Seinfeld reportedly asked to distance themselves from the biography.

On July 23, 2015, according to the Philadelphia City Paper, a Father's Day mural depicting Cosby, Nelson Mandela, and Desmond Tutu, was scheduled for removal. It was painted over after being defaced with graffiti reading "rapist" and "dude with ludes", referencing the recently unsealed 2005 deposition in which the comedian admitted to obtaining Quaaludes to give to women with the intention of having sex with them. The Mural Arts Program was already intending to remove the mural, but rapidly accelerated the removal due to pressure.

On August 17, 2015, New York University's free 12-week film program for high school students cut all ties with Cosby. NYU had previously named the program "William H. Cosby Future Filmmakers Workshop". NYU has since removed Cosby's name from the Future Filmmakers program and deleted the web page containing program information. "The workshops will be continuing, but Cosby's name has been removed... in light of recent events," NYU spokesperson Matt Nagel told NYU Local, in an August 28 email.

On September 2, 2015, a portrait of Cosby made from seeds sparked outrage from attendees at the Minnesota State Fair held at the Agriculture Horticulture Building in Minnesota. Artist Nick Rindo made the crop portrait of Cosby from a type of seeds called rapeseed. He accompanied the Cosby portrait with a small card, explaining that it was made from rapeseed, but one of the staff taped over the word rapeseed. Due to the outrage, it was taken down after a day of display.

On September 11, 2015, Central State University, a historically black college to which Cosby has donated over $2 million, officially permanently removed Cosby's name from the Camille O. & William H. Cosby Communications Center and renamed it the CSU Communications Center. The school had been temporarily covering Cosby's name since July while it made a final decision.

On October 7, 2015, Temple University announced that it would be further distancing itself from Cosby by replacing the vacated seat he resigned from in December 2014 with Temple alumnus and NBC correspondent Tamron Hall. The board was expected to vote on this on October 13, 2015. Hall was expected to take her seat on the board in December.

On November 19, 2015, Central High School's alumni board voted to remove Cosby from its Hall of Fame. Board president Jeffrey Muldawer said the decision was made to "eliminate an issue" that was distracting from its mission. He says some board members did not feel comfortable holding Cosby up as a role model for children. Muldawer says Cosby's removal does not reflect an opinion about the allegations. Cosby attended Central only for part of his freshman year. He was inducted in 1998.

On January 20, 2016, Hampton University, a historically black college, announced the removal of Cosby from its board of trustees due to allegations of multiple sexual assaults: "For decades, Bill Cosby supported Hampton University as an institution of higher education, including serving on its board of trustees. He no longer serves on the board."

On March 31, 2016, the National Museum of African American History and Culture, announced that they would be addressing Cosby's sexual assault allegations in its exhibit. Initially the museum said it would not, but after enormous public pressure it changed its decision. The museum, which opened September 24, included the cover of a comedy album by the Philadelphia-native Cosby and a comic book from his pioneering TV drama I Spy as part of its exhibit on black entertainers and artists.

In January 2017, Ben's Chili Bowl painted over a large mural of Bill Cosby, Barack Obama and other celebrities. The restaurant's owners stated the makeover had nothing to do with the allegations against Cosby.

Cosby and Roman Polanski were expelled from the Academy of Motion Picture Arts and Sciences "in accordance with the organization's Standards of Conduct" on May 1, 2018.

Rescinding of honorary degrees

Many academic institutions have rescinded honorary degrees they awarded to Cosby. Most of them cited Cosby's 2005 deposition. Several of these institutions had never rescinded an honorary degree before, or only once before.

Fordham University rescinded Cosby's honorary degree, making it the university's first in history. Fordham said "The University has taken this extraordinary step in light of Mr. Cosby's now-public court depositions that confirm many of the allegations made against him by numerous women" and that "Mr. Cosby was willing to drug and rape women for his sexual gratification, and further damage those same women's reputations and careers to obscure his guilt, hurt not only his victims, but all women, and is beyond the pale." The next day Cosby's attorney John P. Schmitt sent a letter to Fordham University calling its statement "so irresponsible as to shock the conscience", and saying "The mischaracterization of Mr. Cosby's testimony is so egregious that one can only conclude that it was written by one either unfamiliar with the testimony or determined deliberately to misrepresent Mr. Cosby's words." Schmitt criticized the university for an apparent effort to lend "gratuituous support" to defamation suits pending against Cosby, citing what he called the school's unfounded claim that the entertainer has a "longtime strategy of denigrating the reputations of women who accused him of such actions".

Also rescinding degrees were Marquette University, the University of San Francisco, Brown University, Baylor University, Lehigh University, Goucher College, Tufts University, Franklin & Marshall College, Amherst College, Springfield College, Muhlenberg College, Drexel University, Bryant University, The University of Pittsburgh, Drew University, California State University, City University of New York, Swarthmore College, Boston University, Occidental College, Oberlin College, Haverford College, University of Pennsylvania, Wilkes University, and Yale University.

A number of universities and educational institutions emphasized that they conferred honorary degrees on Cosby based on information known at the time of the award, and while some said they deplored recent revelations about Cosby's conduct, they lacked a policy or mechanism for revoking the honor. Other colleges refused comment, or said decisions were still pending. As of November 2015, Cosby maintained valid honorary degrees from Berklee College of Music; Boston College; Carnegie Mellon University; Colby College; Colgate University; Cooper Union; Delaware State University; Fashion Institute of Technology; George Washington University; Hampton University; Howard University; Johns Hopkins University; New York University; North Carolina A&T State University; Ohio State University; Old Dominion University; Paine College; Pepperdine University; Rensselaer Polytechnic Institute; Rust College; Sisseton Wahpeton College; Talladega College; Temple University; College of William & Mary; University of Cincinnati; University of Connecticut; University of Maryland, College Park; University of Notre Dame; University of North Carolina at Chapel Hill; University of South Carolina; University of Southern California; Virginia Commonwealth University; Wesleyan University; and West Chester University.

Broadcast networks cancel shows
On November 18, 2014, Netflix postponed a Cosby stand-up comedy special after accusations surfaced that Cosby had sexually assaulted Janice Dickinson in 1982.

Reruns of The Cosby Show and other shows associated with Cosby have also been cancelled. On November 19, 2014, TV Land and NBC both ended their relationships with Cosby: TV Land announced that it was pulling reruns from its schedule and removing clips of the show from its website, while NBC scrapped its plans to develop a brand new sitcom starring Cosby. In December 2014, the Magic Johnson-owned Aspire removed the two series I Spy and The Bill Cosby Show from its lineup. In July 2015, broadcast network Bounce TV pulled reruns, and BET's Centric (another Viacom unit) ceased airing reruns. The show still is available on Hulu Plus. Although the series returned to Bounce TV in December 2016, the series was pulled from the network again in April 2018 following Cosby's guilty verdict. Nick Jr. also pulled reruns of Little Bill from its schedule following Cosby's allegations in 2014.

Legislative changes

Ontario sex assault plan
In March 2015, Ontario Premier Kathleen Wynne announced a new plan titled "It's Never Okay", which includes an unprecedented $41 million budget to combat sexual violence and harassment: "The new plan was drafted in response to high-profile incidents that remain under investigation, including sexual-assault allegations against members of the University of Ottawa men's hockey team, Jian Ghomeshi, and Bill Cosby."

Nevada sex assault law
On May 26, 2015, Nevada Governor Brian Sandoval signed a bill that extends the statute of limitations for criminal prosecution of rape from four years to 20 years. Lise Lotte Lublin, who accused Cosby of drugging her in 1989 in a Las Vegas, Nevada hotel, testified in support of the new law and asked Nevada Assembly Member Irene Bustamante Adams to introduce bill AB212.

Colorado sex assault bill
On September 15, 2015, Cosby accusers Beth Ferrier, Heidi Thomas, and Helen Hayes met with State Representative Rhonda Fields, 18th Judicial District Attorney George Brauchler, and others at the Capitol in Denver, Colorado. There they discussed lengthening the current ten-year statute of limitations in Colorado for sexual assault. Gloria Allred, who represents most of the nearly 60 alleged victims, spoke to the gathering via Skype: "I have been to New Jersey, and I'm not aware of any down side since they eliminated the statute (of limitations) for rape and sex assault." Brauchler said he does not want any victim denied a fair hearing because of Colorado's statute, but "I don't have a magic number." Any change would have to be done carefully, he said, because the more time that passes between an alleged sex assault and prosecution, the harder it is for the accused to defend themselves. Fields called the cap for sexual assault arbitrary in view of the fact that most states including Colorado do not have a statutory limit on murder.

On February 11, 2016, The House Judiciary Committee voted 11–0 to send the bill extending the statute of limitations from 10 to 20 years to the full House. Both Ferrier and Thomas, who were alleged victims of Cosby, spoke at the hearing before the decision was made the same day. The bill was cosponsored by Rep. Rhonda Fields and Sen. John Cooke.

Presidential Medal of Freedom bill
On January 5, 2016, it was discovered that U.S. Representative Paul Gosar (R-Ariz.) had been crafting a measure to revoke Cosby's Presidential Medal of Freedom since the July release of a 2005 deposition in which Cosby acknowledged using drugs on women with whom he wanted to have sexual relations. "Cosby has admitted to drugging women in order to satisfy his sexual desires, and, therefore, the Federal government should not recognize Cosby with an honor like the Presidential Medal of Freedom", the bill states. The legislation would further impose criminal penalties on anyone who publicly displays a Medal of Freedom revoked by the president, including up to a year in prison. "To continue honoring Bill Cosby with this prestigious accolade would be an affront to women nationwide, particularly those who were victims of his horrific acts", Gosar wrote in a letter to fellow lawmakers asking them to co-sponsor his bill.

Oregon sex assault bill
A bill in the Oregon Senate would create an exception to the 12-year statute of limitations for the most serious sex crimes—including rape, sodomy and child abuse—allowing prosecutors to bring charges if new concrete evidence emerges. For example, they could reopen the case if multiple victims come forward with similar allegations or if new written evidence is discovered. Senate Bill 1553 was inspired by high-profile rape cases, including the one involving Brenda Tracy, who reported being raped by four football players in Corvallis in 1998, and the one involving Cosby. Under the bill, new victims coming forward could be used as evidence to reopen a case, said Aaron Knott, the legislative director for Oregon Attorney General Ellen Rosenblum. "While Bill Cosby is a celebrity, it's not unique to him", Knott told lawmakers at a committee hearing on February 8, 2016.

California sex assault law
On January 3, 2016, California State Senator Connie Leyva introduced Senate bill 813, named the "Justice for Victims Act". This bill would eliminate the 10-year statute of limitations in California for felony sexual offenses of rape, sodomy, lewd or lascivious acts, continuous sexual abuse of a child, oral copulation, and sexual penetration. The bill has support from Gloria Allred, the San Bernardino County District Attorney's Office and others.

On April 12, 2016, four alleged victims of Bill Cosby, Linda Kirkpatrick, Lili Bernard, Victoria Valentino and "Kasey" testified before the Senate committee. "I wanted them to know that the system failed us," Kirkpatrick said. Also testifying was Attorney Gloria Allred who represents 33 of Cosby's alleged victims.

On September 28, 2016, Governor Jerry Brown signed the bill into law. The law took effect January 1, 2017. It was supported by women's / LGBT rights activist Ivy Bottini and Dr. Caroline Heldman who are also involved in a campaign called #EndRapeSOL to eliminate the statute of limitations on rape in other states. Lili Bernard, Victoria Valentino and other alleged victims of Cosby have contributed to this grassroots effort.

Impact on Cosby's legacy
Joan Tarshis, who had accused Cosby of raping her, within a Salon.com article, compared Cosby's damaged legacy to that of O. J. Simpson, saying "When you hear O. J. Simpson's name, you don't think 'Oh, great football player'. That doesn't come to mind first. I'm thinking it's not going to be 'Oh, great comedian'. It's going to be 'Oh, serial rapist'."

In 2015, Ebony magazine released an issue with Cosby's allegations as the cover story, discussing the importance of The Cosby Show and if it is possible to separate Bill Cosby from Cliff Huxtable. The cover depicted a photograph of The Huxtables with a cracked frame, symbolizing the show's damaged and complicated legacy.

Rolling Stone placed Cosby's concert film Bill Cosby: Himself as number8 on its list of "The 25 Best Stand-Up Specials of All Time", acknowledging the significance of the film while still saying "Yes, it's damned near impossible to watch anything the tainted comedian has done and not think of the headlines, the heckling, the revelations and what is, by any definition, monstrous behavior." They also placed Cosby at number8 on their list of "The Best Stand-up Comics Of All Time", saying "Bill Cosby is not likely to perform again; listening to his records will never have that gentle, sweet sense of nostalgia for anyone; and while it is impossible to disconnect the performer from the man, scrubbing his name from the annals of stand-up would be impossible."

In popular culture 
Fellow stand-up comics, including Dave Chappelle, Judd Apatow, Martin Lawrence, Jim Norton, Bill Maher, Ricky Gervais, Lisa Lampanelli, Jeff Ross and Jim Jeffries, have commented on the allegations in their stand-up.

In the 2016 comedy film Neighbors 2: Sorority Rising, a character jokes "we got Cosby'd" after realizing he's been drugged. South Park, Saturday Night Live, and Family Guy also mocked Cosby for his alleged sexual misbehavior.

Eddie Murphy joked about Cosby's downfall and resurrected his iconic impression of him while accepting the award for the Mark Twain Prize for American Humor.

In 2015, when pornographic actor James Deen was accused of sexual assault by multiple women, The Huffington Post referred to him as "the Bill Cosby of porn".

In late 2018, the Christmas song "Baby, It's Cold Outside" was pulled from several radio stations amid controversy that its lyrics allegedly promote sexual predation. Susan Loesser, daughter of composer Frank Loesser, who wrote the song, blamed Bill Cosby for backlash against its lyric "say, what's in this drink?" Loesser said "Bill Cosby is ruining it for everybody...Ever since Cosby was accused of drugging women, I hear the date rape thing all the time...I think it would be good if people looked at the song in the context of the time. It was written in 1944. It was a different time."

The 2022 premiere of the 21st season of Law & Order touched on the Cosby cases, with the plot being centered around the murder of an entertainer (in this case a singer) released from prison after his conviction was overturned in a manner resembling Cosby's; like Cosby, he had been accused of many counts of rape yet maintained his innocence but was shot and killed by a victim looking for revenge.

In 2022, W. Kamau Bell and Showtime released the documentary We Need to Talk About Cosby, which dissects Cosby's significant contributions to American and African-American culture and interviews his many alleged rape victims, exploring his complicated and difficult legacy.

Hush money payments and cover-up
It has been reported that one of the reasons many of Cosby's accusers did not initially come forward is that Cosby gave them money in exchange for their silence. When asked in his deposition whom he wished to keep the affair from, Cosby replied "Mrs. Cosby".

In November 2014, former NBC facilities manager Frank Scotti told the New York Daily News that while working on The Cosby Show, Cosby funneled regular payments to several women via money orders that Scotti was told to purchase in his own name. Among the women identified in receipts that Scotti preserved for more than 20 years were Shawn Thompson, Cosby's admitted mistress who later accused him of fathering her child, and Angela Leslie, who claimed Cosby made unwanted sexual advances toward her in the early 1990s. Scotti "suspected that [Cosby] was having sex with them". He also noted that Cosby "was covering himself by having my name on [the money orders]. It was a coverup." Scotti also claimed that Cosby regularly took aspiring models and actresses into his dressing room and instructed Scotti, "Stand outside the door and don't let anyone in." In a later interview for NBC Today Show, Scotti said he "felt like a pimp". Cosby's lawyer Martin Singer denied Scotti's accusations and said the walker-bound 90-year-old was merely seeking "his 15 minutes of fame".

In the 2005 deposition that was made public in July 2015, Cosby admitted to making regular payments to Therese Serignese to reward her for good grades.

See also
 Jimmy Savile sexual abuse scandal
 Operation Yewtree

References

External links

 Video referencing the sexual assault allegations by comedian Hannibal Buress, October 2014
 Excerpts From Bill Cosby's Deposition in the Andrea Constand case

2014 scandals
2015 scandals
2000s in the United States
2010s in the United States
2010s trials
Sexual assault cases
Drug-facilitated sexual assault
Sexual abuse cover-ups
Sexual assaults in the United States
Sexual misconduct allegations
Sex crime trials
21st-century American trials
Entertainment scandals
Overturned convictions in the United States
2014 in the United States
Sex crimes in the United States
Scandals in the United States
Rape in the United States